Infinite Possibilities is the debut studio album from American R&B artist Amel Larrieux, released February 15, 2000 on 550 Music and distributed through Epic Records.

The album peaked at seventy-nine on the Billboard 200 chart.

Release and reception

The album peaked at seventy-nine on the U.S. Billboard 200 and reached the twenty-first spot on the R&B Albums chart.

Derrick Mathis of Allmusic gave the album a good review, remarking that "as far as Larrieux's future is concerned, the possibilities are indeed, infinite."

Track listing

Chart history

Album

Singles

"—" denotes releases that did not chart.

Personnel
Information taken from Allmusic.
drums (snare) – Janaki
executive production – Amel Larrieux
fender rhodes – Kwamé, Amel Larrieux
keyboard bass – Amel Larrieux
producer – Amel Larrieux, Laru Larrieux
rainstick – Amel Larrieux
vocals – Amel Larrieux
vocals (background) – Amel Larrieux

Notes

External links
 
 Infinite Possibilities at Discogs

2000 debut albums
Amel Larrieux albums
Epic Records albums